Maqne or Maakne   is a town and municipality in Baalbek District, Baalbek-Hermel Governorate, Lebanon.

Maqne I
Along with Qaa, Maqne I or Maakne I is a type site of the Shepherd Neolithic industry. The surface site was discovered in 1957 by M. Billaux and the materials found were studied by Henri Fleisch and Maurice Tallon. Findings were published by Fleisch in 1966. The Shepherd Neolithic assemblage found resembled that collected from Qaa and was spread over a sterile area of consolidated Neogene alluvial conglomerates. Lorraine Copeland commented that the industry could be found in no particular concentration around a wide area of the northern Beqaa valley. M. Billaux observed that the worked Shepherd Neolithic flints were of far superior quality than the brittle, unworkable flint conglomerates in the area. He suggested that these flints were imported onto the Beqaa plains from elsewhere.

Their second characteristic is the limited number of forms that the tools take, apart from cores being transverse racloirs on small flakes, strong-pointed borers, denticulated or notched thick, short blades and end-scrapers. It was thirdly characterized by a lack of known typology, with only occasional use of Levallois technique. It was determined to be definitely later than the Mesolithic but without any usual forms from the Upper Paleolithic or pottery Neolithic. Henri Fleisch tentatively suggested the industry to be Epipaleolithic and suggested it may have been used by nomadic shepherds. The Shepherd Neolithic has largely been ignored and understudied following the outbreak of the Lebanese civil war.

Tell Maqne
It is a mound of grey soil on top of a cliff that overlooks a ravine of the north Nahle that can be accessed by a road to the east of the village. The tell was found by Lorraine Copeland in the August 1966, who collected a variety of cores, scrapers, blades and burins, all with a white patina. Various groups of pottery were found dispersed and broken up around the area. A collection of Early Bronze Age sherds was made that included chevrons and combed impressions resembling similar pieces found at Bchemoun. Another type of pottery found was a thin, yellow and brown washed type considered similar to the "Smeared Wash" type found by Robert John Braidwood at Amuq. Fragments of inverted-rim platters were also discovered with a reddish black burnish. Other sherds were found with a vibrant red or orange burnish that had small, round handles. Another group of pottery found was of a very rough type, made with chaff-holes and large, coarse grits. Other pottery found indicated Roman and later occupations.

Maurice Tallon did not consider that the tumuli to be found on the nearby plains was prehistoric.

References

External links
 Maqneh, Localiban

Populated places in Baalbek District
Great Rift Valley
Archaeological sites in Lebanon
Beqaa Valley
Shepherd Neolithic sites
Archaeological type sites